Lars Dahl Elstrup (born 24 March 1963) is a Danish former professional footballer, who played for a number of Danish clubs, as well as Dutch club Feyenoord and Luton Town in England. He played 34 matches and scored 13 goals for the Denmark national football team, and was part of the Denmark team which won the 1992 European Championship.

Club career 
Born in the village of Råby, 20 km NE of Randers, Lars Elstrup made his senior debut for local club Randers Sportsklub Freja in 1982. Over the next four seasons, he became a proven goalscorer in Danish football's mostly 2nd highest divisions, and before the 1986 season Elstrup moved to the defending champions Brøndby IF. He played just seven league games for Brøndby, scoring twice, before he moved abroad to play for Dutch club Feyenoord. He played there for two years, but only scored nine goals for the Rotterdam outfit.

In 1988, Elstrup moved back to Denmark to play for Odense BK. He scored 14 goals in 16 games in his first season at Odense, and was called up for the Danish national team by national manager Sepp Piontek.

The 1989 Danish 1st Division saw Elstrup score three times in 12 league games, before he left to try his hand at English football. Elstrup signed for English First Division club Luton Town on 21 August 1989 in a £850,000 transfer deal, setting a club transfer record. Playing at Kenilworth Road for two seasons, he soon settled and scored a total of 18 goals to keep Luton up in 1990–91.

After only two years in England, Elstrup moved back to Denmark to rejoin Odense. Odense only paid £200,000, despite having sold him to Luton only two years before for more than four times that amount, and having attained an impressive goalscoring record at the English club, as well as still being in his twenties. Sure enough, after selling Elstrup, Luton were relegated. He played two more seasons for Odense, scoring 24 goals, before retiring in strange circumstances. These strange circumstances were due to damage to body and mind, quote Lars Elstrup himself.

International career 
Elstrup made his national team debut in August 1988 against Sweden, and scored both goals in a 2–1 victory.

Elstrup was part of the Denmark squad for the 1992 European Championship. He played in two matches at the tournament, and scored the winning goal in the 2–1 win against France in the group stages. He also scored one of Denmark's five penalties in the semi-final penalty shootout against Netherlands, though he was an unused substitute, as Denmark beat Germany 2–0 in the final.

Private life 
In 1993, Elstrup had doubts about his footballing future, as he felt he was living under the expectations of others. He joined a spiritual sect, and took the spiritual name "Darando", meaning "The River that Flows". He moved away from the sect in December 1999 after being arrested for punching a school child. In January 2000, Odense gave Elstrup a chance to re-enter professional football by giving him a trial, but he left the club soon after when the club refused to pay him during the trial. He now lives in Vissenbjerg, and stays out of the public eye.

Honours

Player

Club

Odense BK
Danish 1st Division (1): 1989
Danish Cup 1993

International
Denmark
UEFA European Football Championship: 1992

References

External links 
Danish national team profile

1963 births
Living people
Danish men's footballers
Randers FC players
Brøndby IF players
Feyenoord players
Odense Boldklub players
Luton Town F.C. players
Eredivisie players
English Football League players
Danish Superliga players
Denmark international footballers
UEFA Euro 1992 players
UEFA European Championship-winning players
Danish expatriate men's footballers
Expatriate footballers in the Netherlands
Danish expatriate sportspeople in the Netherlands
Expatriate footballers in England
Danish expatriate sportspeople in England
Association football forwards
People from Randers Municipality
Sportspeople from the Central Denmark Region